An Epic Defiance is the debut album by the metal band Detonation. It was initially issued in October 2002 as a self-financed independent release. In January 2003, the band signed a three-album deal with the French Osmose Productions label, who released the album worldwide in June 2003 on CD and limited edition LP.

The artwork for the album was created by Niklas Sundin of Dark Tranquillity.

Track listing
 "The Dawning (intro)" − 0:40
 "An Epic Defiance" − 3:28
 "The Prophecy Unfolds" − 3:45
 "Sword-Carved Skin" − 5:56
 "Forever Buried Pain" − 3:41
 "Crawling Through Vile" − 3:41
 "The Collision of Despair" − 5:31
 "Deserving Death" − 3:14
 "Voices Beyond Reason" − 4:34
 "Lost Euphoria Part II (instrumental)" − 2:17
 "The Last of My Commands" − 4:08
 "Starve" − 5:00

Credits

Band members
 Koen Romeijn − Vocals, Guitar
 Mike Ferguson − Guitar
 Thomas Kalksma − Drums
 Otto Schimmelpenninck − Bass guitar

Guest appearances
 George Oosthoek − additional speech on track 4 and additional vocals on track 5
 Jorre Jansen − additional vocals on tracks 3 and 11
 Daniel Nak − additional vocals on tracks 6 and 11

Other
 Niklas Sundin − Cover artwork

Detonation (band) albums
2002 debut albums